The Bethlehem Central School District is a public school district in New York State, serving approximately 4,100 students just south of Albany in the towns of Bethlehem and New Scotland in Albany County with a staff of 800+ and a budget of $102 million.

The average class size ranges from 12 to 30 students and the student-teacher ratio is 14:1.

The district's main office is located in Delmar, New York. Jody Monroe is currently the Superintendent. David Hurst, Ph.D. is the Deputy Superintendent.

Board of Education
The Board of Education (BOE) consists of 7 members who reside in the Bethlehem Central School District. Members serve rotating 3-year terms. Elections are held each May for board members and to vote on the School District Budget.

Current Board Members: 
- Holly Dellenbaugh (president)
- Christine Beck (vice-president)
- Willow Baer
- Meredith Moriarty
- Katherine Nadeau 
- Robert Tietjen 
- John Walston

History
The district was founded in 1930.

Schools
The Bethlehem Central School District currently operates five neighborhood elementary schools, one middle school, and one high school across the district. Three elementary schools have been named National Blue Ribbon Schools for academic excellence.

Elementary Schools (K-5)
 Eagle Elementary School, Principal - Dianna Reagan
 Elsmere Elementary School, Principal - Kate Kloss
 Glenmont Elementary School, Principal - Laura Heffernan
 Hamagrael Elementary School, Principal - Ian Knox
 Slingerlands Elementary School, Principal - Andrew Baker

Middle school (6-8)
 Bethlehem Central Middle School, Principal - Michael Klugman, Ed.D.... Assistant Principal - Mark Warford.... Assistant Principal - Jacqueline Munroe

High school (9-12)
 Bethlehem Central High School, Principal - David Doemel Jr... Assistant Principal - Heather Culnan... Assistant Principal - Nicole Conway... Assistant Principal -J ames Smith

Building project
On December 2, 2003 District residents approved a construction and renovation project. This $92.9 million project includes additions, renovations and alterations to all school buildings, the bus garage and education center. It also includes building a new elementary school to accommodate the growing population, and computer network infrastructure improvements.

In 2013 residents passed a proposed project of more than $20 million and in 2016, a facilities improvement project valued at $32 million was approved. The 2016 project included an $8 million renovation of the high school auditorium. The most recent facilities improvement project total $41 million and was approved in fall 2021.

References

External links
 District Website
 New York State School Boards Association

School districts in New York (state)
Education in Albany County, New York
School districts established in 1930